Maho may refer to:

Term
 Maho, tropical hibiscus tree common throughout the Caribbean (thespesia populnea, Hibiscus elatus, or Hibiscus Tilaceus)
 Maho, a West Indian Caribbean slang term for a man who spends too much time drinking beer and fishing on the beach
 a Pali noun for a singular religious festival, the nominative singular of maha
 Maho or Manusia homo (English: Gay man), an Indonesian derogatory term for homosexuality
 A Finnish adjective meaning unable to bear children, sterile.

Geography
Maho Beach, a beach in Sint Maarten
Maho, Sri Lanka, a town in North Western Province
Maho, Eritrea, a town in Eritrea
Maho Bay, a beach in Saint John, U.S. Virgin Islands

People
Maho is a feminine Japanese given name.

Typical kanji spellings include 真帆, 麻帆 and 真穂, though there may be others. It also sometimes rendered in hiragana: まほ and less often in katakana:　マホ.

 (born 2000), Japanese professional footballer
 (born 1976), Japanese long and triple jumper
 (born 2002), Japanese women's professional shogi player
 (born 1987), Japanese announcer and news anchor 
 (born 1993), Japanese idol and voice actress
 (born 1998), Japanese professional footballer
 (born 1980), Japanese actress known for 2LDK
, Japanese field hockey player
, Japanese women's footballer
, Japanese actress, voice actress, and singer
 (born 1967), Japanese actress and model

Fictional characters:
Maho Kazami, a sister of the protagonist of Onegai Teacher
Maho Minami, a character from BECK
Maho, a character from Doki Doki Majo Shinpan
Maho, (Himeko Katagiri), a character from Pani Poni Dash
Maho, a character from Mushi-shi, episode 3 ("Tender Horns" or "Yawarakai Tsuno") 
Maho, a character in Kare Kano
Maho Hiyajo, a character in the visual novel Steins;Gate 0
Maho Nishizumi, a character in Girls und Panzer and its sequels
Maho Nosaka, a character in the film Battle Royale II: Requiem

Japanese feminine given names